The Kronos is a music workstation manufactured by Korg that combines nine different synthesizer sound engines with a sequencer, digital recorder, effects, a color touchscreen display and a keyboard. Korg's latest flagship synthesizer series at the time of its announcement, the Kronos series was announced at the winter NAMM Show in Anaheim, California in January 2011.

Much like Kronos' predecessor and Korg's previous flagship synthesizer workstation, the OASYS, Kronos is basically a custom software synthesizer running on an Intel x86 processor and operating system based on the Linux kernel with RTAI extensions; it includes 9 different sound engines which encompass the entire range of Korg synthesis technologies.

The Kronos X was introduced in July 2012 with OS version 2 and the Kronos 2 with OS version 3 was announced in November 2014 (marketed as "new Kronos"). Updated versions have more memory and new factory sounds, but otherwise have similar hardware based on the Intel Atom processor series, so older models can be upgraded to the newer specs with user-installable OS updates and sound banks.

As of 2022 Kronos is an end-of-life product.

Sound engines
Like its predecessor, the OASYS, the Kronos has multiple sound engines:

1) The SGX-1 Premium Piano sound engine uses continuous (not looped) stereo piano samples sampled at eight velocity layers per key to produce a Steinway-styled "German Grand" or Yamaha-styled "Japanese Grand" acoustic grand piano; an optional Bösendorfer-styled "Austrian Grand" sound set is available. The samples are directly streamed from the internal solid state drive by using VMT (Virtual Memory Technology). This synth engine didn't exist on Korg Oasys.

With the release of Kronos 2, SGX-2 Premium Piano superseded the SGX-1 sound engine. SGX-2 adds modeled string resonance and support for soft pedal samples and 12 velocity layers per key, making possible a new Bechstein-styled "Berlin Grand" soundset which is factory installed on the Kronos 2. Older Kronos models receive an OS update which includes the SGX-2 engine.

2) The EP-1 MDS Electric Piano sound engine offers four models based on specific classic Rhodes electric pianos and two based on Wurlitzer pianos, with software control over hammers, tines, reeds, and mechanical noise elements. It also simulates amplifiers, cabinets, speakers, and effects associated with those historic electric pianos. This synth engine didn't exist on Korg Oasys.

3) The CX-3 Tonewheel Organ engine is carried over from the Korg CX-3 modeled tonewheel organ released in 2001 (not Korg's 1980 CX-3 based on octave-divider technology). The CX-3 engine models a classic tonewheel organ, including rotary speaker effects, vibrato and chorus effects, and tube amplifier. Nine hardware sliders on the Kronos' control panel function as organ drawbar controllers. This synth engine first appeared on Korg Oasys. A significant upgrade to this engine was made in November 2013 with OS 2.1 which improved both the organ model and the Leslie speaker simulation, and was accompanied by two extra banks of organ patches.

4) The HD1 High Definition Synthesizer, which Korg first introduced in the OASYS, uses sample-based synthesis and wave sequencing to generate sounds from the multisamples stored on an internal solid state drive. The capacity of the built-in preset PCM ROM is 314 MB.

5) The MS-20EX Legacy Analog Collection models an expanded version of the original Korg MS-20 semi-modular monophonic analog synthesizer originally released in 1978. This engine is basically an update to the version released by Korg in their "Legacy Collection" software.  It is also found on Korg Oasys as part of the LAC-1 engine.

6) The PolysixEX Legacy Analog Collection models an expanded version of the 6-voice Korg Polysix analog synthesizer produced by Korg from 1982-3. Similar to the MS-20EX, this engine is also an update to the version in Korg's "Legacy Collection" software, and can be found on Korg Oasys as part of the LAC-1 engine.

7) The AL-1 Analog Synthesizer models analog subtractive synthesis, with a range of modeled oscillator waveforms, filters, hard sync, analog-style FM, and ring modulation. This is another sound engine passed down from the Korg Oasys.

8) The MOD-7 Waveshaping VPM Synthesizer is capable of classic FM sounds and has import compatibility with Yamaha DX7 SysEx formatted sounds. The MOD-7 engine also combines Variable Phase Modulation (VPM), waveshaping, ring modulation, samples, subtractive synthesis, and modular patching to create a wider range of sounds than would have been possible on a classic Yamaha DX-series synthesizer. This synth engine first appeared on Korg Oasys.

9) The STR-1 Plucked Strings engine creates sounds derived from the physical properties of struck or plucked string sounds. This sound engine is well-suited for creating sounds like guitar, harpsichord and clavinet, harp, and bell sounds, as well as other sounds based on the physics of a plucked string but not directly related to any known instrument. The STR-1 was first released as an expansion to the Korg Oasys.

Other capabilities
There are 61-, 73-, and 88-key versions of the Kronos, with the latter two employing graded hammer action keys, and the former synth action keys.

The Kronos has a 16-track MIDI sequencer combined with a 16-track 24-bit audio recorder. The recorder can record up to four tracks simultaneously.

197 effect types are available. They can be applied as 16 internal effects, 12 insert effects, 2 master effects, & 2 total effects. In addition to these effects, a separate 3-band EQ for each track is available.

Kronos features the Kay Algorithmic Realtime Music Architecture, or KARMA, a complex arpeggiator that generates complex musical phrases in realtime based on the input of a performer. KARMA was developed by Stephen Kay and first appeared in the Korg KARMA keyboard workstation.

Kronos is capable of sampling audio and has full sample editing functionality. Sample import and export are supported. Import sample formats supported include Korg, Akai, SoundFont, WAV and AIFF files.

Kronos sounds can be computer edited using Kronos editor software. Kronos can also be integrated within a computer digital audio workstation as a software plug-in.

Notable users
 Kiefer (musician)
 Robert Glasper
 Ilaiyaraja
 A.R.Rahman
 Adam Blackstone
 Arca (musician)
 Dave Champagne
 Felix Cavaliere (The Rascals, Ringo Starr & His All-Starr Band)
 Chick Corea
 Tom Coster
 Jae Deal (Janet Jackson, Diane Warren)
 Eldar Djangirov
 George Duke 
 Gary Barlow
 Spike Edney (Queen)
 Keith Emerson
 Russell Ferrante
 Ike Stubblefield
 Mike Finnigan
 Guy Fletcher (Dire Straits, Mark Knopfler)
 Eloy Fritsch
 Peter Gabriel
 Jem Godfrey
 Larry Goldings
 Herbie Hancock
 Tuomas Holopainen (Nightwish)
 Bob Katsionis (Firewind, OUTLOUD)
 Jeff Lorber
 Chris Lowe (Pet Shop Boys)
 Simon Mavin (Hiatus Kaiyote)
 Lyle Mays (Pat Metheny Group)
 Frank McComb
 Kevin Parker (Tame Impala)
 Greg Phillinganes (Michael Jackson: The Immortal World Tour)
 Jordan Rudess (Dream Theater)
 Kurt Ader (KAPRO)
 David Sancious (Bruce Springsteen, Peter Gabriel)
 Derek Sherinian
 Çağri Tozluoğlu (Karnataka)
 Vangelis
 Erick Pastrano
 Adam Wakeman
 Rick Wakeman (Yes, ARW)
 Scott Storch
 Yanni
 Christina Hizon
 Sean Scholes
 The Roots

Time line - Models

 2011 Original Kronos - 2GB RAM, 30GB SSD
 2012 Kronos X - Doubled the size of the internal memory and SSD.   
 2015 Kronos 2 - Major redesign including gold plated sockets, new generation Intel CPU, etc, top of keyboard casing, ventilation mesh, OS V3 (including SGX-2), famous songs library  
 2016 Kronos 88 Platinum Limited Edition - Identical to Kronos 2 but with platinum color
 2017 Kronos 88 Gold Limited Edition - Identical to Kronos 2 but with gold color
 2017 Kronos LS - Kronos 2 with light-touch keyboard (only 88), 14 lbs lighter than Kronos 2 88, OS v3.1, sunburst side panels
 2019 Kronos Special Edition - Identical to Kronos 2, includes EXs21 Italian F from Korg Grandstage and EXs272 KApro Showcase sound libraries, red/black finish
 2020 Kronos Titanium Limited Edition (61 & 88) - Identical to Kronos 2, includes additional EXs library (TBD). Brushed aluminum finish with ebony real wood end cheeks
 2022 EOL

References 

Kronos
Music workstations
Polyphonic synthesizers
Digital synthesizers